Matiya is a village of Vaishali district in the Bihar state of India. It is surrounded by four district of Bihar, which are Samastipur in East, Saran in West, Muzaffarpur in North and Patna in South. The nearest city Hajipur is about 23 km (via Train) and 31 km (via Road) away from here. Nearest Railway Station from here is Desari in West (approx 2 km) and Sahadai Buzurg in East (approx 3 km).

Geography
According to Census 2011 information the location code or village code of Matiya village is 236029. It is located in Sahdei Buzurg Tehsil of Vaishali district in Bihar, India. As per 2009 stats, Chakjamal is the gram panchayat of Matiya.
The total geographical area of the village is 225 hectares.

Holy Places
Kaali Mandir (Bisahar Sthan) is a beautiful Temple in this village. It is a very beautiful Temple, the amazing look of this temple gives a unique identification to the whole Village. The blessings of the God and Goddess always keep happy to all Villagers. The temple is surrounded by the giant trees which provides the sweet and blessy shade.

Education
Rajkiye Utkarmit Madhya (middle) Vidhyalaya, Matiya a Government Middle School which provides education of class 1 to 8 to the Students. It is situated in front of Kaali Mandir.

Upcoming Premises
Government High School, Matiya is an upcoming Premises which will provide a further study of class 9th and 10th to the Students. It is also going to construct just in front of Kaali Mandir.

Transport
By Train(Nearest Railway Station-Desari)Hajipur - Barauni - Muzaffarpur - Patna- By RoadHajipur -  via NH103Barauni-  via SH93Muzaffarpur -  via NH103Patna -  via NH103

Hospital and Health
You can find too many hospitals and medical places for any health related issues within the radius of 10 km.

See also
List of villages in Vaishali district

Villages in Vaishali district